One Alone is a popular song composed by Sigmund Romberg with lyrics by Oscar Hammerstein II and Otto Harbach for their operetta The Desert Song. It was introduced by Robert Halliday.

Cover versions 
The song has been subsequently covered by Nat Shilkret and the Victor Orchestra, and Don Voorhees. Dave Brubeck recorded it on his 2002 album of the same name.

References

1926 songs
Songs with music by Sigmund Romberg
Songs with lyrics by Oscar Hammerstein II
Songs with lyrics by Otto Harbach